Mick McManus (born 27 March 1954) is a Scottish former professional footballer who played as a right winger.

Career
Born in Glasgow, McManus made 278 appearances in the Scottish Football League for Motherwell, Hamilton Academical and Montrose. He also played for Ashfield and Newburgh.

References

1954 births
Living people
Scottish footballers
Ashfield F.C. players
Motherwell F.C. players
Hamilton Academical F.C. players
Montrose F.C. players
Newburgh F.C. players
Scottish Football League players
Association football wingers
Footballers from Glasgow